Saliou Sané (born 19 July 1992) is a German professional footballer who plays as a forward for Regionalliga Bayern club Würzburger Kickers.

References

Living people
1992 births
German people of Senegalese descent
Footballers from Hanover
Association football forwards
German footballers
Hannoverscher SC players
Hannover 96 II players
TSV Havelse players
SC Paderborn 07 players
Holstein Kiel players
Sportfreunde Lotte players
SG Sonnenhof Großaspach players
Karlsruher SC players
Würzburger Kickers players
1. FC Magdeburg players
2. Bundesliga players
3. Liga players
Regionalliga players